Stefan Fengler (born 2 April 1968) is a German former professional footballer who played as a defender.

References

External links
 

Living people
1968 births
Association football defenders
German footballers
2. Bundesliga players
Regionalliga players
Borussia Dortmund II players
SG Wattenscheid 09 players
Rot Weiss Ahlen players
Footballers from Dortmund